Finlay Pickering (born 27 January 2003) is a British cyclist, who currently rides for UCI Continental team .

Major results

2021
 1st  Time trial, National Junior Road Championships
 2nd Overall Grand Prix Rüebliland
 2nd Trofeo Buffoni
 7th Overall Junior Tour of Wales
 8th Time trial, UCI Junior Road World Championships
2022
 1st  Overall Tour Alsace
1st  Young rider classification
1st Stage 3

References

External links

2003 births
Living people
English male cyclists
British male cyclists
People from Cottingham, East Riding of Yorkshire